Mount Hum may refer to:

 Mount Hum (Vis) in southern Croatia
 Mount Hum (Plaški) in central Croatia
 Mount Hum (Sarajevo) in central Bosnia and Herzegovina
 Mount Hum (Mostar) in southern Bosnia and Herzegovina
 Mount Hum (Laško) in Slovenia
 Mount Hum (Pešter) in Montenegro and Serbia
 Mount Hum (Lastovo) in southern Croatia